The 2022 Texas's 34th congressional district special election was held on June 14, 2022. The seat, which went to Democratic president Joe Biden by only four points in the 2020 United States presidential election after being solidly blue in the past, became vacant after Democratic incumbent representative Filemon Vela Jr. resigned on March 31, 2022, to work at the law firm Akin Gump Strauss Hauer & Feld.

Republican candidate Mayra Flores won outright with 51% of the vote. Although Democrat Dan Sanchez was able to hold on to the Hidalgo County portion of the district by nine points, as well as flip Kenedy County after it went to Donald Trump in 2020, it was not enough to overcome Flores's gains in Cameron and Willacy Counties, resulting in them narrowly flipping red in this race after going to Biden by double digits in the 2020 contest. Flores was also able to shore up support in the district's northern rural counties, which typically vote Republican in the past.

Candidates

Democratic Party

Declared
Dan Sanchez, attorney and former Cameron County commissioner
Rene Coronado, civil service director

Declined

Republican Party

Declared
Mayra Flores, respiratory care practitioner, Hidalgo County GOP Hispanic outreach chair, and nominee for this district in the 2022 regular election
Juana Cantu-Cabrera, former Palmhurst city Mayor Pro-Tem, former UTPA nursing professor, Nurse Practitioner, Forensic Nurse examiner  and candidate for this district in the 2022 regular election

Endorsements

Special election

Predictions

Polling

Fundraising

Results

See also
2022 United States House of Representatives elections
2022 United States elections
117th United States Congress
List of special elections to the United States House of Representatives

Notes

Partisan clients

References

External links
Official campaign websites
Juana Cantu-Cabrera (R) for Congress
Mayra Flores (R) for Congress
Dan Sanchez (D) for Congress

Texas 2022 34
Texas 2022 34
2022 34 Special
Texas 34 Special
United States House of Representatives 34 Special
United States House of Representatives 2022 34